Textures: A Photographic Album for Artists and Designers is a compendium of 112 texture photographs by Phil Brodatz. It was published in 1966 by Dover Publications. The texture images are grayscale and taken under controlled lighting conditions. Each texture is accompanied by a brief description of the contents and the conditions under which it was taken, and a unique identifier.

Use in research 
The images in the book are widely used as a standard signal processing and image processing texture dataset. However, the images are copyrighted and the legality of their usage in academic publications is unclear.

See also 
 Lenna, another standard test image in violation of copyright.

External links 
 http://www.ux.uis.no/~tranden/brodatz.html --- Collection of 111 of the original 112 textures (excluding D14). Note that these have been inverted from the originals.

References 

1966 non-fiction books
Datasets in computer vision
Books of photographs